This page shows the results of the Men's Judo Competition at the 1975 Pan American Games, held from October 12 to October 26, 1975 in Mexico City, Mexico. There were a total number of six weight divisions. The judo event returned to the Pan American Games after eight years.

Medal table

Men's competition

Men's Featherweight (-63 kg)

Men's Lightweight (-70 kg)

Men's Middleweight (-80 kg)

Men's Light Heavyweight (-93 kg)

Men's Heavyweight (+93 kg)

Men's Open

References
 Sports 123

1975 Pan American Games
American Games
1975
Judo competitions in Mexico
International sports competitions hosted by Mexico